Lin family murders may refer to:

 Lin family murders (Australia), a family murder in Australia in 2009
 Lin Yi-hsiung#Lin family massacre, a family murder in Taiwan in 1980